David Mari (born 25 April 1995) is an Australian bobsledder. He competed in the two-man event at the 2018 Winter Olympics.

References

External links
 

1995 births
Living people
Australian male bobsledders
Olympic bobsledders of Australia
Bobsledders at the 2018 Winter Olympics
Place of birth missing (living people)